Call and response is a form of communication.

Call and response may also refer to:

In communication:
Call and response (African cultures), a form of community participation in African cultures

In literature:
Call and Response: The Riverside Anthology of the African American Literary Tradition, a literature anthology
Call and Response, a novel by T. R. Pearson

In music:
Call and response (music), a type of musical phrasing or structure
"Call-response" or Coro-pregón, a genre of music
Call and Response: The Remix Album (2008), an album by Maroon 5
A Call and Response (2006), an album by The Longcut
"Call & Response", a song from Controlled Developments (1997) by Source Direct
Call and Response (2002), an album by Bangs
Call and Response, a US West Coast band who released three CDs between 2004 and 2007, including a self-titled album
In film:
Call + Response, a 2008 documentary about the human slave trade

In religion:
Call and response (liturgy) in Christian liturgies